The Crocodile River is a river in South Africa. At its confluence with the Marico River, the Limpopo River is formed.

Course

The Crocodile River has its source in the Witwatersrand mountain range, originating in Constantia Kloof, Roodepoort, Gauteng province. The first dam on the river is the Lake Heritage Dam just west of Lanseria International Airport. Just north of this airport is its confluence  with the Jukskei River. Further downstream into the North West province are the Hartbeespoort Dam and the Roodekoppies Dam. Beyond the Hartbeespoort Dam, the stream passes the town of Brits. The Elands River joins downstream from the Vaalkop Dam, about 20 km further the Pienaars River joins its right bank, shortly after exiting the Klipvoor Dam.

In Limpopo province, about 35 km further, the river passes the town of Thabazimbi and meanders for many miles through a sparsely inhabited area before joining the Marico River just west of Rooibokkraal at the limit of North West province to form the start of the Limpopo River.

Tributaries

The tributaries of the Crocodile River include the Bloubankspruit, Hennops River, Jukskei River, Magalies River, Sterkstroom River, Rosespruit, Skeerpoort River, Kareespruit, Elands River, Bierspruit River and Sundays River.

Pollution

The Crocodile River is one of the most polluted river systems in South Africa. The effects of pollution from two of South Africa's metropolitan areas, Johannesburg and Tshwane, has been detrimental to the ecology of the system. Untreated industrial, mining, agricultural and household waste has deteriorated the water quality throughout most of its course and led to massive algal blooms in the Hartbeespoort Dam and Roodekoppies Dam. Invasive plant species have negatively affected the integrity of the system. Unsustainable farming practices have led to sediment overloads and erosion further harming the river.

Dams

The Crocodile River is part of the Crocodile (West) and Marico Water Management Area. Dams in the river basin are:
 Hartbeespoort Dam
 Roodekoppies Dam
Rietvlei Dam, in the Rietvlei River
 Bon Accord Dam and Leeukraal Dam, in the Apies River
 Klipvoor Dam and Roodeplaat Dam, in the Pienaars/Moretele River
Vaalkop Dam, in the Elands River
Bospoort Dam, in the Hex River (Matshukubjana)

See also 
 Drainage basin A
 List of rivers of South Africa
 List of reservoirs and dams in South Africa

References

External links

Overview of the Crocodile (West)/Marico Water Management Area 
Natural and anthropogenic influences on water quality: an example from rivers draining the Johannesburg Granite Dome
A river runs through Limpopo Province
The influence of land use on water quality and diatom community structures in urban and agriculturally stressed rivers

 
Rivers of Gauteng
Rivers of North West (South African province)
Rivers of Limpopo
Tributaries of the Limpopo River